The Roderick Haig-Brown Prize is part of the BC and Yukon Book Prizes, awarded in celebration of the achievements of British Columbia writers and publishers. It is awarded to the author(s) of books who "contributes most to the enjoyment and understanding of British Columbia". Unlike the other BC and Yukon Book Prizes, there are no requirements in terms of publication or author residence.

Winners and nominees

References

External links
Roderick Haig-Brown Regional Prize, official website

BC and Yukon Book Prizes
Awards established in 2010
2010 establishments in British Columbia